Cryptochiridae is a family of crabs known commonly as gall crabs or coral gall crabs. They live inside dwellings in corals and cause the formation of galls in the coral structure. The family is currently placed in its own superfamily, Cryptochiroidea.

Gall crabs are sexually dimorphic, with males being much smaller than females. Contrary to females, most males are free-living and "visit" females for mating.

These crabs are most common in shallow waters where they live in association with stony corals, but they have also been recorded from mesophotic zones and deep waters. They likely feed on mucus secreted by their coral hosts, as well as various detritus. Some species are thought to be filter feeders.

Because crab size is related to gall size, it is likely that the crabs form the galls, rather than living randomly in a dwelling within a coral. Related groups of gall crab taxa share a similar gall type, suggesting that the crabs influence the morphology of the galls.

The family contains the following twenty-one genera:

Cecidocarcinus Kropp & Manning, 1987
Cryptochirus Heller, 1861
Dacryomaia Kropp, 1990
Detocarcinus Kropp & Manning, 1987
Fizesereneia Takeda & Tamura, 1980
Fungicola Serene, 1966
Hapalocarcinus Stimpson, 1859
Hiroia Takeda & Tamura, 1981
Kroppcarcinus Badaro, Neves, Castro & Johnsson, 2012
Lithoscaptus A. Milne-Edwards, 1862
Luciades Kropp & Manning, 1996
Neotroglocarcinus Fize & Serene, 1957
Opecarcinus Kropp & Manning, 1987
Pelycomaia Kropp, 1990
Pseudocryptochirus Hiro, 1938
Pseudohapalocarcinus Fize & Serène, 1956
Troglocarcinus Verrill, 1908
Sphenomaia Kropp, 1990
Utinomiella Kropp & Takeda, 1988
Xynomaia Kropp, 1990
Zibrovia Kropp & Manning, 1996

References

Crabs
Decapod families